Begum Shamsunnahar Khwaja Ahsanullah is a Bangladeshi politician from the prominent Bangladesh Nationalist Party, a former Member of Parliament, and a member of the Dhaka Nawab family.

Career
Shamsunnahar Khwaja Ahsanullah was selected to the parliament in 1991 as a candidate of the Bangladesh Nationalist Party. She was re-elected in 1996, the 6th parliamentary election of Bangladesh. The general elections were scrapped and another election was called over concerns of fairness in 1996. She was elected to the reserved seats for women in parliament by the Bangladesh Nationalist Party on 5 September 2005. She was an advisor to the Bangladesh Union Sadasya Sangstha. In 2008, she along with 86 other former Bangladesh Nationalist Party leaders expressed their support for party General Secretary Khandaker Delwar Hossain and Chairperson Khaleda Zia during the Caretaker Government rule in Bangladesh. Begum Ahsanullah was sent into exile when the military government came into power.

Along with being a politician, Ahsanullah served as the president of the Salimullah Orphanage since her husband's death in 1978. She resigned from her post as president in 2010.

Personal life

Ahsanullah was married to Nawabzada Khwaja Ahsanullah (1915–1978). She is the daughter-in-law of the Nawab of Dhaka, Sir Khwaja Salimullah. She has one son; Khwaja Zaki Ahsanullah and two daughters; Fawzia Ahsanullah and Ayesha Ahsanullah.

References

1934 births
Living people
Bangladesh Nationalist Party politicians
5th Jatiya Sangsad members
8th Jatiya Sangsad members
Women members of the Jatiya Sangsad
Members of the Dhaka Nawab family
20th-century Bangladeshi women politicians
21st-century Bangladeshi women politicians